The Mahnomen County Courthouse is a Classical Revival brick building at 311 North Main Street in Mahnomen, Minnesota, United States. It was completed in 1909 at a cost of $10,000.

It was still a functioning courthouse when it was added to the National Register of Historic Places in 1984.

See also
 National Register of Historic Places listings in Mahnomen County, Minnesota

References

External links
 Mahnomen County District Court
 

County courthouses in Minnesota
Courthouses on the National Register of Historic Places in Minnesota
Government buildings completed in 1909
National Register of Historic Places in Mahnomen County, Minnesota